Dumb Luck may refer to:
Luck
Dumb Luck (novel), a 1936 novel by Vũ Trọng Phụng
Dumb Luck, a compilation of art by Gary Baseman
Dumb Luck (album), a 2007 album by Dntel
"Dumb Luck", an episode of The Grim Adventures of Billy and Mandy